Godinești is a commune in Gorj County, Oltenia, Romania. It is composed of seven villages: Arjoci, Câlcești, Chiliu, Godinești, Pârâu de Pripor, Pârâu de Vale and Rătez.

References

Communes in Gorj County
Localities in Oltenia